The 89th Infantry Division (89. Infanterie-Division) was a formation of the Imperial German Army in World War I.  The division was formed in November 1914 as the provisional Westernhagen Division (Division Westernhagen), named after its commander.  The nucleus of the unit was troops collected at Posen.  It became the 89th Infantry Division in August 1915.   The division was disbanded in 1919 during the demobilization of the German Army after World War I.

Combat chronicle

The Westernhagen Division initially served on the Eastern Front. It fought in the Battle of Łódź in November/December 1914.  From December 1914 to July 1915, it was in the line in the fighting on the Rawka and Bzura Rivers.  In July and August 1915, it fought around Warsaw and then participated in the siege of Modlin Fortress.  It was redesignated the 89th Infantry Division in August and then fought in the Battles of Neman and Vilnius.  After the line stabilized, the division was in positional warfare until September 1916.  It then went south to participate in the Romanian campaign.  It fought in Romania until the armistice there in December 1917, and thereafter remained in the line securing the armistice.  From May to November 1918, it was in the occupation troops in Romania.  Allied intelligence rated the division as fourth class.

Order of battle on formation

On February 6, 1915, the precursor of the division Truppenabteilung Westernhagen consisted of:

Troop Detachment (Truppenabteilung) Westernhagen 
I., II. & Ersatz Battalions/ Landwehr Infantry Regiment 8
Ersatz Regiment Keller (2 Btl)
Fortress MG Detachment 5 Thorn
2nd & 7th Landsturm Squadrons, V A.K.
2nd Ersatz Battery/ Field Artillery Regiment 56
Landsturm Battery, XVIII A.K.
1 captured Russian battery
4th Battery/ Reserve Foot Artillery Regiment 11 (Heavy Field Howitzers)
2nd battery/ Reserve Foot Artillery Regiment 15 (10-cm Cannons)
2nd Reserve Co./ Pioneer Battalion 17

The 89th Infantry Division was formed as an understrength division, with only two infantry regiments.  It later received a third regiment, becoming a regular triangular division.  The order of battle of the division on August 9, 1915, was as follows:

178. Infanterie-Brigade
Landwehr-Infanterie-Regiment Nr. 8
Infanterie-Regiment Nr. 375
2. Landsturm-Eskadron/V. Armeekorps
7. Landsturm-Eskadron/V. Armeekorps
Feldartillerie-Abteilung Nr. 89
4.Kompanie/Reserve-Fußartillerie-Regiment Nr. 5
4.Kompanie/Reserve-Fußartillerie-Regiment Nr. 11
2.Kompanie/Reserve-Fußartillerie-Regiment Nr. 15
2.Reserve-Kompanie/Pionier-Bataillon Nr. 17

Late-war order of battle

The division underwent a number of organizational changes over the course of the war.  Cavalry was reduced and artillery and signals commands were formed.  The order of battle on October 15, 1917, was as follows:

178.Infanterie-Brigade
Landwehr-Infanterie-Regiment Nr. 8
Infanterie-Regiment Nr. 333
Infanterie-Regiment Nr. 375
Maschinengewehr-Kompanie Nr. 89
4.Eskadron/Dragoner-Regiment von Wedel (Pommersches) Nr. 11
Artillerie-Kommandeur 89
Feldartillerie-Regiment Nr. 89
I.Bataillon/Kgl. Bayerisches 4.Fußartillerie-Regiment
5.Kompanie/Pionier-Bataillon Nr. 26
Divisions-Nachrichten-Kommandeur 89

References
 Division Westernhagen (Chronik 1914/1915) - Der erste Weltkrieg
 89. Infanterie-Division (Chronik 1915/1918) - Der erste Weltkrieg
 Franz Bettag, Die Eroberung von Nowo Georgiewsk. Schlachten des Weltkrieges, Bd. 8 (Oldenburg, 1926)
 Hermann Cron et al., Ruhmeshalle unserer alten Armee (Berlin, 1935)
 Hermann Cron, Geschichte des deutschen Heeres im Weltkriege 1914-1918 (Berlin, 1937)
 Erich von Falkenhayn, Der Feldzug der 9. Armee gegen die Rumänen und Russen, 1916/17 (Berlin, 1921)
 Oberstleutnant a. D. Dr. Curt Treitschke, Der Rückmarsch aus Rumänien. Mit der Mackensen-Armee vom Sereth durch Siebenbürgen nach Sachsen (Dresden 1938)
 Günter Wegner, Stellenbesetzung der deutschen Heere 1825-1939. (Biblio Verlag, Osnabrück, 1993), Bd. 1
 Histories of Two Hundred and Fifty-One Divisions of the German Army which Participated in the War (1914-1918), compiled from records of Intelligence section of the General Staff, American Expeditionary Forces, at General Headquarters, Chaumont, France 1919 (1920)

Notes

Infantry divisions of Germany in World War I
Military units and formations established in 1914
1914 establishments in Germany
Military units and formations disestablished in 1919